Watford High Street is a railway station in Watford, Hertfordshire, United Kingdom. It is served by the Watford DC line on the London Overground network. It is the only station on the line's sole deviation from the West Coast Main Line.

History

The line came under the ownership of London and North Western Railway (LNWR), which was absorbed into the London, Midland and Scottish Railway (LMS) in 1923, following the grouping of Britain's railway companies.

After nationalisation in 1948, the Watford DC Line was run by British Rail (from 1986 under its Network SouthEast brand). At the height of operation around the 1950s, Watford High Street was served by the Bakerloo line, and by British Rail trains on both the Croxley Green and Rickmansworth branches, a local all-stations service to Euston and another local service to  via . Over the years, most of these services were gradually withdrawn. The Rickmansworth branch was a poorly used service and passenger services were terminated by BR in 1952. Croxley Green services continued as Parliamentary trains until the line closed fully in 1996. London Broad Street station was closed in 1986 and trains on the Primrose Hill route were diverted to  until 1992, when passenger services on the Primrose Hill line were withdrawn completely. After the withdrawal of the Croxley, Bakerloo and Broad Street routes, the only remaining service running from Watford High Street was British Rail's Watford DC Line to Euston.

Following the privatisation of British Rail the franchise for the Watford DC Line was taken over by National Express who ran the line under its Silverlink Metro name. In 2007 the line was brought under the control of Transport for London, who today operate it as part of the London Overground network; this service uses the 750 V DC lines for its all-stations local service with the 4th rail presently redundant except as part of the electrical return circuit.

Location

Watford High Street station is located in the Lower High Street in Watford town centre. In the immediate vicinity around the station are a number of retail and civic amenities including the Watford Museum, containing a gallery of fine art and displays of local heritage, and the   atria Watford Shopping Centre (also known as the Harlequin Centre), the largest shopping centre in Hertfordshire, which attracts more than 17 million customers each year. Various other shopping parks are also close to the station, including a large Tesco Extra, Waterfields Shopping Park (containing large stores such as Sports Direct and Next), as well as many stores situated on the High Street.

Watford town centre has many popular bars and clubs, such as PRYZM; the only producing theatre in Hertfordshire, the Watford Palace Theatre; as well as numerous restaurants and cafes, both chain and independent.

To the east of the railway line is the site of Benskins Brewery, the office building for which is now Watford Museum. The brewery was rail-served by sidings until 1956.
The station is situated in a deep cutting covered by a single platform canopy. The roof of the canopy is connected to the concrete sided cutting by ornamental metal trusses.

Services
All services to this station are operated by London Overground. It is on the Watford DC line of the network and operates with a frequency of 4 trains per hour, approximately every 15 minutes Monday to Sunday.

Connections
The station is served by local Routes 8, 142, 258, 306, 306B, 306C, 398, 602, W19 and W20.

Other services to alternate destinations operate from Watford town centre bus stops, which are a short distance from the station.

Future

In 2011, a project to extend the London Underground's Metropolitan line to Watford Junction was announced. The planned Croxley Rail Link would have diverted the Metropolitan line branch across the town along a reinstated stretch of disused track of the former Watford and Rickmansworth Railway; the link would then have joined the Watford DC Line just south of Watford High Street, and Underground trains would have shared track with London Overground through to Watford Junction. The scheme was cancelled in 2018 due to funding difficulties.

References

External links

 

Railway stations in Watford
DfT Category D stations
Former London and North Western Railway stations
Railway stations in Great Britain opened in 1862
Railway stations served by London Overground
Proposed London Underground stations
1862 establishments in England